Alysson is a genus of hymenopterans in the family Crabronidae. There are at least 40 described species in Alysson.

Species
These 42 species belong to the genus Alysson:

 Alysson annulipes Cameron, 1897 i c g
 Alysson attenuatus Wu and Zhou, 1987 i c g
 Alysson caeruleus Wu and Zhou, 1987 i c g
 Alysson cameroni Yasumatsu and Masuda, 1932 i c g
 Alysson carinatus Wu and Zhou, 1987 i c g
 Alysson conicus Provancher, 1889 i c g
 Alysson costai de Beaumont, 1953 i c g
 Alysson erythrothorax Cameron, 1902 i c g
 Alysson flavomaculatus Cameron, 1901 i c g
 Alysson guichardi Arnold, 1951 i c g
 Alysson guignardi Provancher, 1887 i c g b
 Alysson guillarmodi Arnold, 1944 i c g
 Alysson harbinensis Tsuneki, 1967 c g
 Alysson japonicus Tsuneki, 1977 i c g
 Alysson jaroslavensis (Kokujev, 1906) c g
 Alysson katkovi Kokujev, 1906 c g
 Alysson madecassus Arnold, 1945 i c g
 Alysson maracandensis Radoszkowski, 1877 i c g
 Alysson melleus Say, 1837 i c g b
 Alysson monticola Tsuneki, 1977 i c g
 Alysson nigrilabius Wu and Zhou, 1987 i c g
 Alysson ocellatus de Beaumont, 1967 i c g
 Alysson oppositus Say, 1837 i c g b
 Alysson pertheesi Gorski, 1852 i c g
 Alysson picteti Handlirsch, 1895 i c g
 Alysson radiatus W. Fox, 1894 i c g
 Alysson ratzeburgi Dahlbom, 1843 i c g
 Alysson ruficollis Cameron, 1898 i c g
 Alysson seyrigi Arnold, 1945 i c g
 Alysson sichuanensis Wu and Zhou, 1987 i c g
 Alysson spinosus (Panzer, 1801) i c g
 Alysson striatus W. Fox, 1894 i c g
 Alysson taiwanus Sonan, 1940 i c g
 Alysson takasago Tsuneki, 1977 i c g
 Alysson testaceitarsis Cameron, 1902 i c g
 Alysson tomentosus McLeay, 1828 i c g
 Alysson triangularis Krombein, 1985 i c g
 Alysson triangulifer Provancher, 1887 i c g b
 Alysson tricolor Lepeletier and Audinet-Serville, 1825 i c g
 Alysson tridentatus Wu and Zhou, 1987 i c g
 Alysson verhoeffi Tsuneki, 1967 i c g
 Alysson yunnanensis Wu and Zhou, 1987 i c g

Data sources: i = ITIS, c = Catalogue of Life, g = GBIF, b = Bugguide.net

References

External links

 

Crabronidae
Articles created by Qbugbot